Bolma martinae is a species of sea snail, a marine gastropod mollusk in the family Turbinidae, the turban snails.

Description
The height of the shell attains 10 mm.

Distribution
This marine species occurs off Papua New Guinea.

References

martinae
Gastropods described in 2005